Bloody Oaks Quarry is a  biological Site of Special Scientific Interest north-west of Great Casterton in Rutland. It is owned and managed by the Leicestershire and Rutland Wildlife Trust.

This site has species-rich grassland on Jurassic limestone. The dominant grasses are tor-grass and upright brome and flora include rock-rose, salad burnet, yellow-wort and autumn gentian.

The site is open to the public. The name alludes to the 1470 Battle of Losecoat Field (also known as the Battle of Empingham). There is mention of Bloody Oaks Wood from circa 1800.

References

Sites of Special Scientific Interest in Rutland
Leicestershire and Rutland Wildlife Trust